eco – Verband der Internetwirtschaft e.V is the German Internet trade association and advocacy group.

The association defines itself as a special interest group of Internet oriented businesses, and has the goal of promoting technologies, shaping framework conditions and representing the interests of its members towards policy makers and in national and international committees. With more than 1,100 member companies across 70 countries, eco is the largest Internet industry association in Europe, .

eco is focused principally on the German Internet industry, and since 1997 has been active in lobbying for Internet legislation, establishing legal precedents on Internet-related issues, and operating the DE-CIX Internet exchange points, which are among the largest in the world.

History 
Founded on June 26, 1995 in Bonn, the name "eco" was chosen as an abbreviation of "electronic commerce."

DE-CIX 
eco is the organizational parent of DE-CIX, the "German Commercial Internet Exchanges"). The first and largest of the DE-CIX exchanges is the one which eco established in Frankfurt in 1995. , DE-CIX Frankfurt is the largest Internet exchange in the world by volume of bandwidth, producing an average of 7 terabits per second, and third-largest by number of participating networks, after Sao Paulo and Jakarta. And , DE-CIX maintains 29 IXPs throughout Europe, Asia, and North America.

Political lobbying 
The group is registered as a political lobbying group by the German Bundestag and the transparency register of the European Commission and Parliament.

Anti-spam congresses 
eco has hosted annual German Anti-Spam Congresses since 2003, which have been integrated into the German "Internet Security Days" since 2011.

Cloud computing 
The establishment of EuroCloud Deutschland_eco e. V. took place in 2009. EuroCloud Germany_eco e. V. is an association of the cloud computing industry in Germany and part of the European EuroCloud network with the StarAudit.

Cyber ​​defense  
The Advanced Cyber Defense Center (ACDC) is a center in which 28 partners from 14 European countries, coordinated by eco and funded by the European Union, jointly improve the security of networks and systems against botnets and malware. It opened in 2013. Another eco office was opened in Brussels in 2016. The center operates five principle projects:
A centralized clearing house, acting as a single point of contact for data storage and analysis.
A support center, delivering structured information to stakeholders and affected end users
An analytic function focusing on the detection and mitigation of infected websites.
An analytic function focusing on the detection of botnets and network anomalies
The development of tools for identification and removal of malware from end user devices.

Awards 
eco annually presents the eco Internet Awards to companies which have made important contributions to the German Internet industry, and publishes numerous white-papers and industry reports.

See also 
 DE-CIX, a daughter company

Notes

References

Sources

External links
 eco - Association of the Internet Industry official website

International trade associations
Trade associations based in Germany
Organizations established in 1995
German companies established in 1995
Internet technology companies of Germany
Stub-Class Germany articles
Science articles needing translation from German Wikipedia
Government and politics articles needing translation from German Wikipedia